Tariq Aziz  (1 July 1945 – 24 May 2014 ) was an Iraqi football striker who played for Iraq between 1967 and 1971. He also played for Al-Shorta.

On 24 May 2014, Aziz died at the age of 68.

Career statistics

International goals
Scores and results list Iraq's goal tally first.

References

1945 births
2014 deaths
Iraqi footballers
Iraq international footballers
Al-Shorta SC players
Association football forwards